A City district is a designated administrative division that is generally managed by a local government. It is used to divide a city into several administrative units.

City districts are used in Russia (raion), Pakistan and Croatia ( or gradska četvrt).

The term is also the English translation for the German: Stadtbezirk, French: arrondissements, Dutch: stadsdeel, Swedish: stadsdel and Polish: dzielnica.

By country/region

Russia (raion) 
In Russia, a city district (raion) is a second-level administrative unit used to divide a city. It is the standardised administration unit of numerous post-Soviet states, two levels below national subdivision.

Germany (Stadtbezirk) 
In Germany, a city district (Stadtbezirk) is an administrative unit that divides a metropolis of more than 150,000 inhabitants.

France & Francophonie (arrondissements) 
A city district, or municipal arrondissement (French: arrondissement municipal [aʁɔ̃dismɑ̃ mynisipal]), is a subdividing unit used in France's three largest cities: Paris, Lyon and Marseille. It divides a commune within which it has its own mayor.

An arrondissement is also a term used for administrative divisions in areas such as Belgium, Haiti, and other certain Francophone countries.

Mexico City (borough) 
There are 16 city districts of Mexico City. These are 15 subdivisions, formally known as boroughs, and the Federal District (Spanish: distrito federal).

See also
City Districts of Pakistan

References

Types of administrative division
 
City